Walter Kurt Hayman FRS (6 January 1926 – 1 January 2020) was a British mathematician known for contributions to complex analysis. He was a professor at Imperial College London.

Life and work
Hayman was born in Cologne, Germany, the son of Roman law professor Franz Haymann (1874-1947) and Ruth Therese Hensel, daughter of mathematician Kurt Hensel. He was a great-grandson of acclaimed composer Fanny Mendelssohn. Because of his Jewish heritage, he left Germany, then under Nazi rule, alone by train in 1938. He continued his schooling at Gordonstoun School, and later at St John's College, Cambridge under John Edensor Littlewood and his doctoral advisor Mary Cartwright. He taught at King's College, Newcastle, and the University of Exeter.

In 1947, he married Margaret Riley Crann: together, they founded the British Mathematical Olympiad.

He is known for his asymptotic results in Bieberbach conjecture in 1955, and for Hayman's alternatives in Nevanlinna Theory. His work with Wolfgang Fuchs gave a solution to an inverse problem of the Nevanlinna theory for entire functions, predating David Drasin's 1976 work.

Honours and awards
Hayman was elected to the Royal Society in 1956 and of the Finnish Academy of Science and Letters in 1978: he was elected "Foreign member" of the Accademia dei Lincei on 16 December 1985. In 1992 he received an honorary doctorate from the Faculty of Mathematics and Science at Uppsala University, Sweden In 1995 he was awarded the De Morgan Medal by the London Mathematical Society. In 2008, an issue of the Journal Computational Methods and Function Theory was dedicated to him on the occasion of his 80th birthday.

Selected publications

Papers
.
.
.
.
.

Books
.
.
.
.
.

Notes

References

Biographical references
. The "Yearbook" of the renowned Italian scientific institution, including an historical sketch of its history, the list of all past and present members as well as a wealth of information about its academic and scientific activities.
.
.

General references
. The review of the autobiographical book of Hayman.
 (online ).

External links

Obituary at the London Mathematical Society

1926 births
2020 deaths
20th-century British mathematicians
21st-century British mathematicians
People educated at Gordonstoun
Alumni of St John's College, Cambridge
Fellows of the Royal Society
German expatriates in the United Kingdom
British people of German-Jewish descent
Complex analysts
Mathematical analysts
Mathematics education in the United Kingdom
Deans of the Royal College of Science
De Morgan Medallists